Fresno Dome is a dominant granite dome rising in isolation above the forest of Soquel Meadow in the Sierra National Forest in Madera County, California.

The dome as known to the Mono Indians as "the greeting place" ("wah-me-yelo"). John Muir encountered Fresno Dome, calling it "Wamello", in the 1870s, and used its summit to locate Fresno Grove (now known as Nelder Grove).

It is accessible by a trailhead which is a three-mile drive from the Sierra Vista Scenic Byway (part of the National Scenic Byway system). The nearest town is Bass Lake, California,  to the south.

At its base, sits the Fresno Dome campground, a backwoods campground accessible only by jeep trails. The campground is a favorite spot for deer hunters and is largely empty other than during deer season. The dome offers several technical free climbs rated  or better, with "Guides in a Snowbank" rated at 5.10a.

See also
 Half Dome
 Lembert Dome
 Batholith
 Geology of the Yosemite area

References

Granite domes
Mountains of Madera County, California
Sierra National Forest
Mountains of the Sierra Nevada (United States)
Mountains of Northern California